Kitamori (written: 北森) is a Japanese surname. Notable people with the surname include:

, Japanese discus thrower
, Japanese Lutheran theologian

See also
Kitamori Station, a railway station in Hachimantai, Iwate Prefecture, Japan

Japanese-language surnames